Santa Maria Madre della Provvidenza a Monte Verde is a 20th-century parochial church and titular church in Rome, dedicated to Our Lady of Providence.

History 

The church was built in 1937, its construction ordered by Cardinal Francesco Marchetti Selvaggiani. It was originally intended for the Barnabites, but has been administered by parish clergy since its opening.

In 1969, it was made a titular church to be held by a cardinal-priest.
Titulars
 Luis Aponte Martínez (1973–2012)
Orani João Tempesta (2014–present)

References

External links

Titular churches
Rome Q. XII Gianicolense
Roman Catholic churches completed in 1937
20th-century Roman Catholic church buildings in Italy